In Sufism, a murīd (Arabic مُرِيد 'one who seeks') is a novice committed to spiritual enlightenment by sulūk (traversing a path) under a spiritual guide, who may take the title murshid, pir or shaykh. A sālik or Sufi follower only becomes a murīd when he makes a pledge (bayʿah) to a murshid. The equivalent Persian term is shāgird.

The initiation process of a murīd is known as ʿahd or bai'ath. Before initiation, a murid is instructed by his guide, who must first accept the initiate as his disciple. Throughout the instruction period, the murīd typically experiences waridates like visions and dreams during personal spiritual awrads and exercises. These visions are interpreted by the murshid. A common practice among the early Sufi orders was to grant a khirqa or a robe to the murīd upon the initiation or after he had progressed through a series of increasingly difficult and significant tasks on the path of mystical development until attaining wasil stage. This practice is not very common now. Murīds often receive books of instruction from murshids and often accompany itinerant murshids on their wanderings.

See also
Murīdūn, Andalusian movement that revolted against Almoravid authority in 1144
Murid War, war between Russia and a Caucasian Naqshbandi movement in the 19th century
Mouride brotherhood, a prominent Sufi tariqa in West Africa, founded in 1883
 Talibe
 Salik
 Wasil
 Majzoob
 Muqarrab

References

External links
 Qualities of a Successful Murid
 Sufi Live
 The Online Murid Library (DaarayKamil.com)

Arabic words and phrases
Sufism